This is a list of World War II weapons of Switzerland.

Small arms

Bolt Action rifles & lever action 

 Furrer Carbine K31 ~528,230
 Schmidt-Rubin infantry rifle M1911
 SIG Mondragón M1894 Licensed production of the Mexican Mondragón M1893  rifle
 Swiss-Mannlicher M1893 Carbine ~7,750
 Swiss Vetterli M1881 Stutzer ~11,000+
 Winchester M1866 Swiss copies

Semi-automatic rifles 

 AK44 Swiss copy of the Soviet Tokarev SVT-40 rifle. ~1
 SIG Mondragón M1908 Licensed production of the Mexican Mondragón M1908 semi-automatic rifle

Anti-tank rifles 
 Solothurn S-18/100 ~12+
 Tankbüchse Solo 40/ Solothurn S-18/1000 ~93
TB 41 W+F Tankbüchse 24mm
M41

Semi-automatic pistols 

 Swiss Luger 06/29 Swiss version of the german Luger P08
 SIG P210 Swiss copy of the French M1935A, few prototypes were made during WW2, serial production started after the war ~11 (44/16)
 W+F Bern Pistol M43 Was supposed to replace the Luger 06/29 but in the end the SIG P210 was chosen

Revolvers 

 Schmidt Revolver Model 1882/29
 Swiss Ordnance revolver M1872/78 ~20,000+

Light Machine guns 

 Furrer Lmg 25
 SIG Neuhausen KE7 Mostly for export
 Solothurn S2-200 Swiss Version of the MG30
 Kiraly M1935 Based on the SIG KE7, only prototype for testing purposes

Machine guns 

 MG 11 ~10,000+
 FLab MG 29/38
 Reibel Pz Mg 38 Were mounted on tanks

Submachine guns 

 Furrer Lmg-Pist 41/44 ~9,808
 SIG MKPS ~60 Was extremely expensive and complicated to produce, so less was spent on the Swiss Army
Hispano-Suiza MP 43/44 ~22,600 Swiss version of the Finnish Suomi KP/-31 
SIG Bergmann M1920 Swiss Version of the german Bergmann MP18/I
Solothurn S1-200 Swiss version of the austrian Steyr MP34
SIG MP-41 Neuhausen ~200 Small amounts for testing purposes only
Furrer MP19 Small amounts for testing purposes only
Furrer M1921 Automatic Carbine Small amounts for testing purposes only
Flieger-Doppelpistole 1919 Small amounts for testing purposes only
Furrer Fliegerpistole Small amounts for testing purposes only

Rifle Catriges (Swiss made) 
7.5x55mm Swiss GP 11
10.4x38mm R Swiss Vetterli M69/81 (.41 Swiss)
7.5mm M1882 Ordnance
20x138mmB Long Solothurn
24 X 138 TB41

Anti-aircraft guns 
2 cm Flakvierling 38
2 cm FLAK 30
Solothurn ST-5

Autocanons 
Oerlikon FF
Oerlikon 20 mm

Armoured fighting vehicles (AFVs)

Light tanks 

 Renault FT ~5
 Vickers Commercial light tank
 LT vz 38 ~24
Vickers Carden Lyod ~8
Landsverk L-60 ~1 for assessment
Renault R35 ~12
Nahkampfkanone 1 ~1

Artillery and Anti-Tank Canons 
 Solothurn S-18/1100
 7.5 cm GebirgsKanone 06 L14
 Bofors 75 mm Model 1934
 8.4 cm Feldgeschütz Ord 1871
 8.4 cm Feldgeschütz Ord 1879
 5.7 cm Fahrpanzer
 10.5 cm Hb Model 46 Swiss version of the swedish Bofors 10,5 cm Haubits m/40

Planes

Fighter Planes 

 Morane-Saulnier M.S.450 ~322 Produced in-house under the designation D-3800 and D.3801/3803.
 Messerschmitt Bf 109 ~129 Operated 10 D-1s, 89 E-3a "Emil" variants, 2 F-4s and 14 G-6s.
 Dewoitine D.27 ~66 Produced directly in Switzerland
 Hanriot HD.1 ~16 Ex surplus planes of the Italians
 Nieuport 28A ~15
 Machhi M.5 ~7
 Comte AC-1 ~1
 Militärapparat MA-7 ~1
 Häfeli DH-4 ~1

Bomber Planes 

 Potez 25 Jupiter ~2 Export version, powered by a 313 kW (420 hp) Gnome-Rhône 9Ac Jupiter radial. Built under licence by Ikarbus in Yugoslavia and OSGA in Portugal
 EKW C-3603 ~160
 de Havilland DH.98 Mosquito ~2+1 One was captured by the Swiss
 Fokker C.V ~64 3x D variant and 61x E variant
 Dornier Do 217 N-2 ~1 One was captured by the Swiss

Reconnaissance Planes 

 Fokker C.VI ~3
 EKW C-35 ~160
 Häfeli DH-5A ~80
 Häfeli DH-3 ~109
 Häfeli DH-2 ~6
 Häfeli DH-1 ~6

Observation Planes 

 Fieseler Fi 156 C-3 Storch ~5
 Potez 25 ~17
 Comte AC-11-V ~1 Mapped areas during WWII

Communication Planes 

 Messerschmitt Bf 108B Taifun ~18
 de Havilland DH.89 Dragon Rapide ~3
 Comte AC-12 Moskito ~1

Transport Planes 

 Siebel Si 204 ~1
 Junkers Ju 52/3m Tante Ju ~3
 Messerschmitt M18d ~4
 Fokker F.VIIb ~11
 Junkers F.13 ~4
 Comte AC-8 ~1
 Curtiss AT-32C Condor II ~1
 Junkers Ju-86 B-0 ~2
 Douglas DC-2 ~6
 Douglas DC-3 ~16

Trainer Planes 

 Pilatus P-2 ~55
 Comte AC-4B Gentleman ~2
 Bückerbü 131B Jungmann ~94
 Bückerbü 133A Jungmeister ~52 Was manufactured by Dornier under license for the Swiss Air Force
 Focke-Wulf Fw 44J Stieglitz ~1
 Nardi FN.315 Alfa Romeo ~2
 Dewoitine D.26 ~11
 Morane-Saulnier MS.229 ~2
 Nieuport 28 C.1 ~5

References 

Weapons
World War II weapons
World War II weapons of Switzerland